Jorge de Albuquerque was the 7th Governor of Portuguese Ceylon. De Albuquerque was appointed in 1622 under Philip III of Portugal, he was Governor until 1623. He was succeeded by Constantino de Sá de Noronha.

References

Governors of Portuguese Ceylon
16th-century Portuguese people
17th-century Portuguese people